McManamon is a surname. Notable people with the surname include:

Brendan McManamon (born 1982), Irish Gaelic footballer
Colm McManamon, Gaelic footballer
James Emmett McManamon (1905-1954), American politician
Kevin McManamon (born 1986), Irish Gaelic footballer
Matt McManamon, English singer-songwriter and guitarist
Paul F. McManamon (born 1946), American scientist